The 14th Legislative Assembly of Quebec was the provincial legislature in Quebec, Canada that existed from May 22, 1916, to June 23, 1919. The Quebec Liberal Party led by Lomer Gouin was the governing party.

Seats per political party

 After the 1916 elections

Member list

This was the list of members of the Legislative Assembly of Quebec that were elected in the 1916 election:

Other elected MLAs

Other MLAs were elected in this mandate during by-elections

 William Robert Oliver, Quebec Liberal Party, Brome, November 12, 1917
 Joseph-Ferdinand Daniel, Quebec Liberal Party, Montcalm, November 12, 1917
 Ernest Ouellet, Quebec Liberal Party, Dorchester, December 15, 1917
 Joseph Caron, Quebec Liberal Party, Ottawa, December 15, 1917
 Honoré Achim, Quebec Liberal Party, Labelle, December 15, 1917
 Joseph-Alcide Savoie, Quebec Liberal Party, Nicolet, December 15, 1917
 Octave Fortin, Quebec Liberal Party, Matane, December 27, 1918
 Henry Miles, Quebec Liberal Party, Montréal-St-Laurent, December 27, 1918
 Amédeée Monet, Quebec Liberal Party, Napierville, December 27, 1918

Cabinet Ministers

 Prime Minister and Executive Council President: Lomer Gouin
 Agriculture: Joseph-Édouard Caron
 Colonisation, Mines and Fishing: Charles Devlin Ramsey (1912-1914), Honoré Mercier Jr. (1914-1916)
 Public Works and Labor: Louis-Alexandre Taschereau 
 Lands and Forests: Jules Allard 
 Roads: Joseph-Édouard Caron (1912-1914), Joseph-Adolphe Tessier (1914-1916)
 Municipal Affairs: Walter Georges Mitchell (1918-1919)
 Attorney General:Lomer Gouin
 Provincial secretary: Louis-Jérémie Décarie 
 Treasurer: Peter Samuel George MacKenzie (1912-1914), Walter Georges Mitchell (1914-1916)
 Members without portfolios: Napoleon Séguin (1919)

References

 1916 election results
 List of Historical Cabinet Ministers

14